Moshkabad (also Romanized as Moshkābād; also known as Moshgābād-e Masīleh and Mushkābād) is a village in Qomrud Rural District, in the Central District of Qom County, Qom Province, Iran. At the 2006 census, its population was 179, in 41 families.

References 

Populated places in Qom Province